This is an incomplete list of Bien de Interés Cultural landmarks in the Province of A Coruña, Spain.

References 

 
A Coruna